is a JR West Geibi Line station located in 5-chōme, Fukawa, Asakita-ku, Hiroshima, Hiroshima Prefecture, Japan.

History 
 1915-04-28: Kumura Station opens
 1987-04-01: Japanese National Railways is privatized, and Kumura Station becomes a JR West station
 2008-05-09: Japanese newspaper and news program report on two cats found sleeping on the ticket gate machine in this station. The cats are dubbed the "Station Cats".

Station building and platforms 
Kumura Station features one side platform capable of handling one line.  Trains bound for Shiwaguchi and Miyoshi are handled on the upper end (上り) of the platform, and trains bound for Hiroshima are handled on the lower end (下り).  Tickets were formerly sold at the supermarket located in front of the station.  The station is unmanned and features an automated ticket vending machine.  Kumura Station is a prefabricated building with a galvanized steel roof.  As the station building is located above the road, passengers must ascend a set of stairs to access the station.

Environs 
 Kōyō New Town
 Egeyama Kōen
 Hiroshima Kōyō Kanahira Post Office
 Yagi Post Office
 Hiroshima Municipal Kōyō High School
 Hiroshima Municipal Shiroyama Kita Junior High School
 Hiroshima Municipal Ochiai Elementary School
 Hiroshima Municipal Yagi Elementary School
 Hiroshima Municipal Bairin Elementary School
 JR West Kabe Line Kami-Yagi Station (1.5 km west)
 JR West Kabe Line Bairin Station (1.5 km west)
 Ōta River (太田川)
 Takase Ōhashi

Highway access 
 Japan National Route 54
 Hiroshima Prefectural Route 37 (Hiroshima-Miyoshi Route)
 Hiroshima Prefectural Route 270 (Yagi-Midorii Route)
 Hiroshima Prefectural Route 271 (Yagi Route)

Connecting lines 
All lines are JR West lines. 
Geibi Line
Miyoshi Express
No stop
Commuter Liner
No stop
Miyoshi Liner/Local
Shimofukawa Station — Kumura Station — Akiyaguchi Station

References

External links 
 JR West

Railway stations in Hiroshima Prefecture
Railway stations in Japan opened in 1915
Geibi Line
Hiroshima City Network
Stations of West Japan Railway Company in Hiroshima city